Events from the year 2019 in Albania.

Incumbents
President: Ilir Meta 
Prime Minister: Edi Rama
Deputy Prime Minister: Senida Mesi (until 17 January); Erion Braçe (from 17 January)

Events

May 
 10–14 May – Albania competed in the Eurovision Song Contest 2019 with Jonida Maliqi’s song Ktheju tokës.

June 
 30 June  – Local Elections

November 
 26 November – A 6.4-magnitude earthquake struck Albania, killing 51.

Deaths

References

 
Years of the 21st century in Albania
Albania
2010s in Albania
Albania